Baharon Phool Barsao is a 1972 Bollywood romance film. The film stars Dheeraj Kumar.

Cast

Soundtrack
 "O Dharti Ke Chand" - Asha Bhosle
 "Suno Ek Baat Sanam" - Asha Bhosle

External links
 

1972 films
1970s Hindi-language films
1972 romantic drama films
Indian romantic drama films